Eric Ward (born April 12, 1987) is a former professional Canadian football quarterback He last played for the Edmonton Eskimos of the Canadian Football League. He was released by the Eskimos on June 2, 2012. He played college football for the Richmond Spiders. He was part of the Richmond Spiders teams that captured two CAA Football crowns in 2007 & 2009 and the NCAA Division I FCS championship in 2008. He finished with a four year college record of 41-12.

References

External links
CFL profile
Just Sports Stats

1987 births
Living people
American players of Canadian football
Canadian football quarterbacks
Milwaukee Mustangs (2009–2012) players
Edmonton Elks players
Players of American football from Atlanta
Richmond Spiders football players
American football quarterbacks